There was a single special election in 1921 to the United States Senate.  It was held in New Mexico for the Class 2 seat, previously held by Albert B. Fall, who resigned March 3, 1921 to become U.S. Secretary of the Interior. Holm O. Bursum was appointed March 11, 1921 to replace him until this special election.  On September 20, 1921 he also won the election.

See also 
 1921 United States Senate elections

References 

 

1921
New Mexico
United States Senate
New Mexico 1921
New Mexico 1921
United States Senate 1921